Kevin Flórez (born Kevin Rafael Flórez Rodríguez, August 19, 1991) is a Colombian singer-songwriter. For his work in the urban champeta genre, he has won several local and national awards. He is known for songs like La invité a bailar (2013), Con ella (2013), and La pikotera (2019).

Life and career 
Flórez was born in Cartagena, Colombia. He made his debut in music with the album Kevin Florez, el rey de la champeta urbana in 2013. The album was produced by Ronnie Molina.

In 2013 Flórez received the Congo de Oro award during Barranquilla's Carnival.

In 2014, it was reported that Flórez had a large following in social media, which at the time included 170,000 followers on Instagram.

In 2021, Flórez released the single "Borracho bailando champeta", cowritten with musician Captain Planet.

Discography 
 Kevin Flórez, el rey de la champeta urbana (2013)
 La supremacía (2018)
 Young King (2020)

Personal life 
Flórez has two brothers and one sister. He is married with three daughters.

References

External links 
 Official Spotify page of Flórez

1991 births
Living people
Colombian singer-songwriters
21st-century Colombian male singers
Folk singers
People from Cartagena, Colombia